Penn's Cave House is a historic structure, once used as a hotel from 1885 until 1919. It is located on the property of Penn's Cave & Wildlife Park at Gregg Township, Centre County, Pennsylvania. It is now used strictly for offices for Penn's Cave, Inc., and has not offered overnight or hotel accommodations since 1919. The Penn's Cave property includes seven contributing buildings, one contributing site (the cave), and two contributing structures.  Penn's Cave House was built in 1885, and is a three-story, seven-bay, frame building with a high mansard roof. It sits on a limestone foundation. It was extensively remodeled in 1938, and again in 1960.  A one-story, rear wing was added in 1962, and was a coffee shop for cave visitors until 1980, when the Penn's Cave Visitors Center was built and opened.  In 1980, it became a private residence.  Its upper floors are used for corporate offices, private meetings and special events.

The cave is a popular tourist attraction and features a natural curiosity with its Trenton (or Beekmantown) limestone formations.  The cave measures approximately 1,300 feet in length and the height of the cave roof measures up to 55 feet above the surface of the stream which is 3 to 5 feet deep throughout the cave. The temperature within the cave remains a constant 52 degrees Fahrenheit year round. 

It was added to the National Register of Historic Places in 1978.

Penn's Cave Airport is adjacent to the park.

Penn's Cave was fined by the USDA in 2021 for the deaths of 34 white tailed deer, 11 of which were shot. Some of the deer were killed for "looking sick" but there was no notification or consultation with the veterinarian as legally required. 18 of the 21 white tailed deer born at Penn's Cave in 2020 died.

References

External links

Penn's Cave website

Caves of Pennsylvania
Hotel buildings on the National Register of Historic Places in Pennsylvania
Houses completed in 1885
Buildings and structures in Centre County, Pennsylvania
National Register of Historic Places in Centre County, Pennsylvania